The Albany Great Danes baseball team is a varsity intercollegiate athletic team of the University at Albany in Albany, New York, United States. The team is a member of the America East Conference, which is part of the National Collegiate Athletic Association's Division I. It plays home games at Varsity Field on the university's campus in Albany, New York. The Great Danes are coached by Jon Mueller.

History
Albany's baseball program played its first season in 1958.  After spending several decades in Division III, it began the transition to Division I in the mid-1990s along with the school's other teams.

Division I
It played its first season in Division I in 2000, also hiring head coach Jon Mueller that year.  After competing as an independent in 2000 and in the New York State Baseball Conference in 2001, it played its first season in the America East in 2002.  In 2004, the Great Danes set a program record with 37 wins and reached their first Division I postseason, going 1–2 at that season's America East Tournament.  In 2007, the team won the AEC Tournament as the third seed to reach its first NCAA Tournament at any level.  As the fourth seed at the Fayetteville Regional, Albany went 0–2, losing 9–0 to host Arkansas and 21–11 to second seed Creighton.

Year-by-year results
Below is a table of Albany's yearly records as an NCAA Division I baseball program.

MLB Draft
, nine players have been selected from Albany in the Major League Baseball draft and none have reached the majors. The highest selections have been Michael Kenney (9th round, 211th overall in 1974) and Stephen Woods (8th round, 245th overall in 2016).

See also
List of NCAA Division I baseball programs

Notes

References

External links